USS Oklahoma was a battleship that served in the United States Navy from 2 May 1916, to 1 September 1944. The ship capsized and sank during the attack on Pearl Harbor on 7 December 1941, but she was righted in 1943. While other ships sunk during the Pearl Harbor attack were repaired and returned to service, she was not and never returned to duty. Instead, Oklahoma was stripped of guns and superstructure, and sold for scrap.

When Navy personnel receive orders to take command of a ship in the United States they will receive an order from the Chief of Naval Personnel stating: "Proceed to the port in which USS [name of ship] may be and upon arrival, report to your immediate superior in command, if present, otherwise by message, for duty as commanding officer of USS [name of ship]." In the 1990 edition of the United States Navy Regulations Article 0807 states that before leaving his command the commanding officer or CO will inspect the ship with the new CO and have the crew perform some sort of drill or exercise, "unless conditions render it impracticable or inadvisable." Also, before the old commanding officer leaves the ship he should turn over all keys to the incoming CO. Before the CO leaves the ship he is entitled to a say a few words and, according to Naval regulations "the officer relieved, though without authority after turning over the command, is, until final departure, entitled to all ceremonies and distinctions accorded a commanding officer."

During her nearly three decades of service, the Oklahoma had 22 commanding officers.  The first Captain was Roger Welles, who took command after Oklahoma'''s commissioning in 1916, serving over a year. The longest serving commanding officer was John D. Wainwright, who served over for over two years in the position, from 13 May 1930 – 25 June 1932.  Oklahoma''s last commanding officer was Howard D. Bode, although he was not on board when the battleship was sunk at Pearl Harbor. When the Japanese attacked, Bode was on the USS Maryland and Commander Jesse L. Kenworthy Jr., acting as the ship's captain, gave the order to abandon ship.

Commanding officers

See also

Annotations

Notes

References
 – Total pages: 682 

 – Total pages: 163 

 – Total pages: 564 
 – Total pages: 256

External links
NavSource Online: Battleship Photo Archive BB-37 USS Oklahoma 1912–1926
USS Oklahoma (BB-37) official web site

Nevada-class battleships
USS Oklahoma
 List of USS Oklahoma
USS Oklahoma